Charles Cleveland Johnson (March 12, 1885 – August 28, 1940) was a center fielder in Major League Baseball who played for the Philadelphia Phillies in 1908.

External links

Philadelphia Phillies players
Major League Baseball center fielders
1885 births
1940 deaths
Bradford Drillers players
Johnstown Johnnies players
Utica Utes players
Trenton Tigers players
York White Roses players
Northern Lehigh High School alumni
Baseball players from Pennsylvania
Sportspeople from Lehigh County, Pennsylvania